Robert Hatch Kennett (9 September 1864 – February 15, 1932) was Regius Professor of Hebrew at the University of Cambridge from 1903 to 1932.

References

Regius Professors of Hebrew (Cambridge)
1864 births
1932 deaths
Hebraists
Academics of the University of Cambridge
Fellows of Queens' College, Cambridge